The 2015 LPGA of Japan Tour is the 48th season of the LPGA of Japan Tour, the professional golf tour for women operated by the Ladies Professional Golfers' Association of Japan. The 2015 schedule includes 37 official events worth ¥3.4 billion.

Schedule
The number in parentheses after winners' names show the player's total number wins in official money individual events on the LPGA of Japan Tour, including that event. All tournaments are played in Japan.

Events in bold are majors.

The Toto Japan Classic is co-sanctioned with the LPGA Tour.

External links
 

LPGA of Japan Tour
LPGA of Japan Tour
LPGA of Japan Tour